The 2009–10 Barako Energy Coffee Masters season was the 10th season of the franchise in the Philippine Basketball Association (PBA). In the Philippine Cup, they were known as the Barako Bull Energy Masters.

Key dates 
 August 2: The 2009 PBA Draft took place in Fort Bonifacio, Taguig.

Draft picks

Roster

Philippine Cup

Eliminations

Standings

Game log 

|- bgcolor="#edbebf"
| 1
| October 14
| Alaska
| 82–99
| Aljamal (18)
| Aljamal (15)
| Dimaunahan (3)
| Araneta Coliseum
| 0–1
|- bgcolor="#bbffbb"
| 2
| October 18
| Coca Cola
| 83–71
| Membrere (14)
| Aljamal, Crisano (8)
| Dimaunahan (5)
| Araneta Coliseum
| 1–1
|- bgcolor="#edbebf"
| 3
| October 23
| Purefoods
| 77–92
| Menor (14)
| Crisano (10)
| Najorda (4)
| Cuneta Astrodome
| 1–2
|- bgcolor="#bbffbb"
| 4
| October 28
| Rain or Shine
| 89–81
| Alonzo (15)
| Alonzo (11)
| Alonzo, Dimaunahan (5)
| Araneta Coliseum
| 2–2

|- bgcolor="#edbebf"
| 5
| November 6
| Barangay Ginebra
| 86–94
| Najorda (15)
| Crisano (10)
| Dimaunahan (7)
| Cuneta Astrodome
| 2–3
|- bgcolor="#edbebf"
| 6
| November 13
| Talk 'N Text
| 90–93
| Menor (12)
| Alonzo (8)
| Belano (6)
| Ynares Center
| 2–4
|- bgcolor="#edbebf"
| 7
| November 15
| San Miguel
| 89–104
| Aljamal (21)
| Crisano (7)
| Hubalde (5)
| Araneta Coliseum
| 2–5
|- bgcolor="#edbebf"
| 8
| November 20
| Burger King
| 86–102
| Menor, Hubalde (17)
| Crisano (10)
| Dimaunahan (5)
| Araneta Coliseum
| 2–6
|- bgcolor="#edbebf"
| 9
| November 22
| Sta. Lucia
| 77–80 (OT)
| Aljamal (14)
| Alonzo (12)
| Lao (5)
| Araneta Coliseum
| 2–7
|- bgcolor="#edbebf"
| 10
| November 29
| Alaska
| 88–99
| Aljamal (21)
| Crisano (11)
| Dimaunahan (4)
| Ynares Sports Arena
| 2–8

|- bgcolor="#edbebf"
| 11
| December 4
| Barangay Ginebra
| 76–88
| Najorda (14)
| Alonzo (9)
| Hubalde (6)
| Araneta Coliseum
| 2–9
|- bgcolor="#edbebf"
| 12
| December 9
| Purefoods
| 66–70
| Fernandez (12)
| Alonzo (18)
| Chia, 2 others (3)
| Araneta Coliseum
| 2–10
|- bgcolor="#edbebf"
| 13
| December 18
| Burger King
| 99–102
| Aljamal (21)
| Alonzo (12)
| Belano (9)
| Araneta Coliseum
| 2–11
|- bgcolor="#edbebf"
| 14
| December 23
| Rain or Shine
| 72–88
| Menor (18)
| Menor (10)
| Hubalde, Belano (3)
| Cuneta Astrodome
| 2–12

|- bgcolor="#edbebf"
| 15
| January 8
| San Miguel
| 85–94
| Menor, Dimaunahan, Duncil (16)
| Reyes (13)
| Belano (6)
| Cuneta Astrodome
| 2–13
|- bgcolor="#bbffbb"
| 16
| January 10
| Talk 'N Text
| 99–97
| Alonzo (23)
| Najorda (8)
| Alonzo, Chia (4)
| Araneta Coliseum
| 3–13
|- bgcolor="#edbebf"
| 17
| January 17
| Sta. Lucia
| 86–108
| Aljamal (20)
| Aljamal (11)
| Belano, Dimaunahan (4)
| Araneta Coliseum
| 3–14
|- bgcolor="#edbebf"
| 18
| January 20
| Coca Cola
| 89–91
| Crisano (19)
| Alonzo (13)
| Alonzo (6)
| Cuneta Astrodome
| 3–15

Fiesta Conference

Eliminations

Standings

Transactions

Pre-season

Philippine Cup

Fiesta Conference

References 

Barako Bull Energy Boosters seasons
Barako